William Adams Dawson (November 5, 1903 – November 7, 1981) was a U.S. Representative from Utah.

Born in Layton, Utah, Dawson attended the public schools.
He graduated from the law department of the University of Utah in 1926.
He was admitted to the bar the same year and commenced practice in Salt Lake City, and was County attorney of Davis County from 1926 to 1934, and mayor of Layton 1935–1939.
He served as member of the Utah State Senate from 1940 to 1944.

Dawson was elected as a Republican to the Eightieth Congress (January 3, 1947 – January 3, 1949).
He was an unsuccessful candidate for reelection in 1948 to the Eighty-first Congress.

Dawson was elected to the Eighty-third, Eighty-fourth, and Eighty-fifth Congresses (January 3, 1953 – January 3, 1959).
Dawson voted in favor of the Civil Rights Act of 1957.
He was an unsuccessful candidate for reelection in 1958 to the Eighty-sixth Congress.
He served as vice president of Zions First National Bank from 1959 to 1969.
He was a resident of Salt Lake City, Utah, until his death on November 7, 1981.
He was interred in Kaysville Cemetery, Kaysville, Utah.

References

External links
 

1903 births
1981 deaths
20th-century American politicians
Mayors of places in Utah
People from Layton, Utah
Politicians from Salt Lake City
Republican Party members of the United States House of Representatives from Utah
University of Utah alumni
Utah lawyers
Republican Party Utah state senators
20th-century American lawyers
S.J. Quinney College of Law alumni